Dasysphinx tarsipuncta is a moth of the subfamily Arctiinae. It was described by William Schaus in 1905. It is found in Brazil.

The forewings are hyaline (glass like). The basal area is black to near the middle. The veins are black. The hindwings are black with a large
elliptical hyaline patch.

References

Euchromiina
Moths described in 1905